The 2015–16 season was Bihor Oradea's 57th season in the Romanian football league system, and their 37th season in the Liga II. On 12 January 2016, during the winter break, the club was declared bankrupt, after serious financial problems and several months in which the club lived from one day to the next.

Players

First team squad
As of 15 August 2017

Club officials

Board of directors

Technical staff

Pre-season and friendlies

Competitions

Overview

Liga II

League table

Result round by round

Results

Cupa României

See also

2015–16 Cupa României
Liga II

Notes and references

FC Bihor Oradea seasons
FC Bihor Oradea